Tripleurospermum inodorum, common names scentless false mayweed, scentless mayweed, scentless chamomile, wild chamomile, mayweed, false chamomile, and Baldr's brow, is the type species of Tripleurospermum. This plant is native to Eurasia and North Africa, and introduced to North America, where it is commonly found in fields, fallow land and gardens.

Historically included the genus Matricaria, Tripleurospermum inodorum has been the subject of some controversy, with many revisions in recent years. The Flora Europaea uses Matricaria perforata for this species. Synonyms/other scientific names include Tripleurospermum perforatum (Mérat) Lainz, Tripleurospermum maritimum subsp. inodorum.

Ecology

 Height: 20–80 cm (8–32 in.). Usually 1-stemmed. Stem erect–ascending, branching, glabrous, green.
 Flower: Single flower-like, usually 3–5 cm (1.2–2 in.) capitula, surrounded by involucral bracts. Capitula's ray-florets white, tongue-like, tip shallowly 3-toothed; disc florets yellow, tubular, small. Stamens 5. Pistil of 2 fused carpels. Involucral bracts different lengths, 1–1.5 mm (0.04–0.06 in.) broad, light brown–white margins. Disc stacked, full. Capitula 1–20 borne in a corymbose cluster.
 Cotyledons：oribicular to oblong， very small，3 to 5 mm long, Stalkless
 Leaves and stems: Alternate, short-stalked–stalkless. Blade 2–3 times pinnately lobed (–with leaflets), glabrous, lobes (or leaflets) long, thread-like narrow, sharp-pointed. Leaves are ¾ to 3 inches long, feathery with a few to numerous thread-like branching lobes. Stems are single, erect, branched in the upper plant, weakly ridged or lined, hairless though sparsely hairy when young.
 Fruit: Flattish, ridged achene, with 2 round–angular oil spots, tip sometimes with small, membranous ring.
 Habitat: Fields, fallow land, lawns, wasteland, roadsides, yards, gardens.
 Flowering time: June–October.
 Life cycle: annual, short-lived perennial

Pollen is collected by solitary bees.

Ecological definition: Weed. Tripleurospermum inodorum has been classified as a noxious weed (class C) in the state of Washington and is considered invasive in other states (it is resistant to some herbicides); it is a weed of cereals in western Canada. W. L. Applequist (2002) has shown that the name Matricaria inodora is not a superfluous new name for M. chamomilla as earlier stated by S. Rauschert (1974). Therefore, the appropriate name under Tripleuro-spermum is T. inodorum. She also considered its type to belong in T. maritimum and formally recognized it there as subsp. inodorum, on the basis of hybridization with other T. maritimum subspecies (A. Vaarama 1953); on the same basis, however, Hämet-Ahti maintained the species distinction between T. inodorum and T. maritimum, while making T. phaeocephalum a subspecies of the latter.  According to Canadian regulations, it is classified as Secondary Noxious, Class 3 and Noxious, Class 5 in the Canadian Weed Seeds Order, 2016 under the Seeds Act.

Similar species

False mayweed (Tripleurospermum maritimum) 

 False mayweed achenes are a similar size, brown colour, and rectangular shape as scentless chamomile. The rib arrangement and the resin glands are also similar to scentless chamomile.
 False mayweed achenes usually have less space between the ribs, the resin glands cannot be seen from the top of the achene, and the resin glands are often brown and oval rather than round and reddish compared to scentless chamomile.

Mythology
In Sweden and Norway, it is called Baldr's brow, but in Iceland, it is the close relative Sea Mayweed (Matricaria maritima) that carries this name. In Gylfaginning, Snorri Sturluson explains that the name Balder's brow comes from the plants' whiteness:

References and footnotes

External links

Anthemideae